Jochen Fallmann (born 19 February 1979) is an Austrian football coach and a former player. He is currently the manager of SKU Amstetten.

Coaching career

Fallmann took over of the reserve team of St. Pölten at the beginning of the 2013–14 season. His first match was a 3–2 win against ASK Bad Vöslau on 10 August 2013. He became the interim head coach of the first team on 21 March 2015. He became the third coach of the 2014–15 season after Herbert Gager was sacked in October 2014 and Michael Steiner was sacked on 21 March 2015. His final match as reserve team head coach was a 1–0 win against SV Neuberg on 21 March 2015.

He was appointed as first team assistant manager under Karl Daxbacher for the 2015/16 season. From 3 October to 27 October, Fallmann took over the reserve team of the club as a caretaker manager. He was in charge for three games, and got only one point. On the same day, he was promoted to first team manager. In September 2017, he decided to resign.

In March 2019, he was appointed as manager of SKU Amstetten.

Coaching record

References

1979 births
Living people
Association football midfielders
Austrian footballers
Austrian Football Bundesliga players
FC Admira Wacker Mödling players
LASK players
SKN St. Pölten players
First Vienna FC players
SKN St. Pölten managers
Austrian football managers
People from Sankt Pölten
Footballers from Lower Austria